East Hampshire is a constituency represented in the House of Commons of the UK Parliament since 2010 by Damian Hinds of the Conservative Party.

History
The seat was created in 1983 chiefly to replace the Petersfield constituency.
The first MP was (by election) Michael Mates, who held it from 1983 until the calling of the 2010 election when he retired.

Boundaries and profile

1983–1997: The District of East Hampshire wards of Binsted, Bramshott and Liphook, Clanfield and Buriton, East Meon and Langrish, Froyle and Bentley, Froxfield and Steep, Grayshott, Headley, Horndean Catherington, Horndean Hazleton, Horndean Kings, Horndean Murray, Liss, Petersfield Heath, Petersfield St Mary's, Petersfield St Peter's, Rowlands Castle, Selborne, The Hangers, Whitehill Bordon and Whitehill, and Whitehill Lindford, and the District of Hart wards of Church Crookham, Crondall, Fleet Courtmoor, Fleet Pondtail, Fleet West, Hook, Long Sutton, and Odiham.

1997–2010: The District of East Hampshire wards of Alton Holybourne, Alton North East, Alton North West, Alton South East, Alton South West and Beech, Clanfield and Buriton, East Meon and Langrish, Farringdon, Four Marks, Froxfield and Steep, Horndean Catherington, Horndean Hazleton, Horndean Kings, Horndean Murray, Liss, Medstead, North Downland, Petersfield Heath, Petersfield St Mary's, Petersfield St Peter's, Ropley and West Tisted, Rowlands Castle, and The Hangers, and the Borough of Havant wards of Cowplain, Hart Plain, and Waterloo.

2010–present: The District of East Hampshire wards of Alton Amery, Alton Ashdell, Alton Eastbrooke, Alton Westbrooke, Alton Whitedown, Alton Wooteys, Binstead and Bentley, Bramshott and Liphook, Downland, East Meon, Four Marks and Medstead, Froxfield and Steep, Grayshott, Headley, Holybourne and Froyle, Lindford, Liss, Petersfield Bell Hill, Petersfield Causeway, Petersfield Heath, Petersfield Rother, Petersfield St Mary's, Petersfield St Peter's, Ropley and Tisted, Selborne, The Hangers and Forest, Whitehill Chase, Whitehill Deadwater, Whitehill Hogmoor, Whitehill Pinewood, and Whitehill Walldown.

The boundaries resemble the East Hampshire district, shifted somewhat north. The south of the seat has many farm, tourist and outdoor leisure businesses in the South Downs National Park.  Results present a Conservative safe seat by length of tenure and size of majorities.  On national opinion-poll adjusted results, Hinds achieved the 28th-highest vote share for the party in 2017. The Liberal Democrats or its predecessor the Liberals have finished second in the elections, bar: 
2015, where this was the UKIP candidate,
2017 where this was the Labour candidate.

Members of Parliament

Elections

Elections in the 2010s

Elections in the 2000s

Elections in the 1990s

Elections in the 1980s

See also
 List of parliamentary constituencies in Hampshire

Notes

References

Parliamentary constituencies in Hampshire
Constituencies of the Parliament of the United Kingdom established in 1983
East Hampshire District